Ron "Rony" Schneider is an Israeli former professional association footballer who played for the Rochester Lancers and was formerly the head coach of the Israel women's national football team. Today, he is a football commentator and has been credited as being a driving force in bringing women's association football to Israel.

References

External links
 NASL Profile

Living people
Israeli Ashkenazi Jews
Israeli footballers
Israeli expatriate footballers
Rochester Lancers (1967–1980) players
North American Soccer League (1968–1984) players
Women's national association football team managers
Association football forwards
Year of birth missing (living people)
Jewish footballers
Israeli football managers